The Wadi Salib riots were a series of street demonstrations and acts of vandalism in the Wadi Salib neighborhood of Haifa, Israel, in 1959, sparked by the shooting of a Moroccan Jewish immigrant by police officers. Demonstrators accused the police of ethnic discrimination against Mizrahi Jews.

History

On July 9, 1959, police confronted a Wadi Salib resident, Yaakov Elkarif, who was drunk and disturbing the peace. When he began behaving erratically and hurling empty bottles at the police sent to arrest him, he was shot and seriously wounded. Residents surrounded the police vehicle and dragged an officer out of it. He was released only after shots were fired in the air.

Conflicting testimonies arose from the event. One witness claimed Elkarif provoked the officer through threats. Another witness offered that Elkarif, perceived as a stereotypical Moroccan immigrant, violent and hot-tempered, was shot for his lack of standing in society. Lastly, another witness claimed that the officer fired with the intention of calming the situation which resulted in Elkarif's accidental shooting. 

After false rumors circulated that he had died, several hundred Wadi Salib residents marched to Hadar HaCarmel, a predominantly Ashkenazi district, smashing shop windows and setting cars on fire. Back in Wadi Salib, the angry demonstrators targeted the headquarters of Mapai [Labor Party] and the Histadrut (the Israeli congress of trade unions). The police tried to disperse the demonstrators by force, leaving 13 police and 2 demonstrators wounded. 34 demonstrators were arrested.

On July 11, riots broke out in other locales in Israel, particularly in large communities of Maghrebi immigrants, like Tiberias, Beersheba, and Migdal HaEmek. It was claimed the riots were not completely spontaneous, and that a local movement, Likud Yotsei Tsfon Africa (Union of North African Immigrants) was involved in planning some of them. David Ben-Haroush, one of the movement's founders, was sent to prison. Ben-Haroush ran for the next Knesset elections while incarcerated, on the Union's list, though he failed to cross the electoral threshold.

Ashkenazi-Mizrahi relations
The perceived discrimination against Mizrahim is believed to have been one of the main catalysts to the riot. This event was the initial recognition of an existing ethnic discrimination among Israeli Jews. Prior to the creation of Israel in 1948 the term “Mizrahim“ did not exist but entered the Jewish lexicon as a term used broadly by Ashkenazim to refer to Jews from the Middle East and North Africa. The Mizrahim were viewed as passive recipients whereas the Ashkenazim actively contributed to the creation of the Zionist vision of a Jewish-national community in Israel. Most Mizrahim were forced to immigrate to Israel, arriving as destitute refugees; a status they assumed when Arab states retaliated against the declaration of Israeli statehood in 1948 by seizing the homes and property of their Mizrahim citizens. 

The Wadi Salib riots still resonate in Israeli society as a symptom of the social malaise that led to clashes between Mizrahi and Ashkenazi Jews.

Legacy
In 1979, Amos Gitai produced a film on the subject - Me'oraot Wadi Salib. The Wadi Salib riots have been discussed in many scholarly articles.

References

External links
Yfaat Weiss, A Confiscated Memory: Wadi Salib and Haifa's Lost Heritage, Columbia University Press, 2011.
A Black Flag in a Red City, Haifa City Museum

1959 in Israel
Ethnic riots
Protests in Israel
Mizrahi Jewish culture in Israel
Racism in Israel
Sephardi Jewish culture in Israel